Tagbilaran Airport (Cebuano: Tugpahanan sa Tagbilaran, Filipino: Paliparan ng Tagbilaran)  was an airport serving the general area of Tagbilaran, the capital city of the province of Bohol in the Philippines. The airport was built and opened in the 1960s until it was closed for scheduled passenger services on November 27, 2018, when it was replaced by the new Bohol–Panglao International Airport.

History
Tagbilaran Airport was built and opened in the 1960s and became Bohol's main gateway since its opening. Prior to 1995, Philippine Airlines was the sole airline operating flights from Tagbilaran Airport to Ninoy Aquino International Airport and Mactan–Cebu International Airport from Tagbilaran Airport with a frequency of 2 to 3 flights a day. The airport formerly served flights from Mactan–Cebu International Airport until these flights were cancelled due to the introduction of ferry services between Cebu and Bohol.

In the 2000s and 2010s, the airport reached capacity and was congested. The airport was not capable of operating during nighttime. A new airport in Panglao Island was planned to replace Tagbilaran Airport. The feasibility study for the new airport project started in 2000 and was approved in 2012.

The 2013 Bohol earthquake caused damage including the collapse of a ceiling in the control tower. Operations were suspended for three hours but later resumed.

Closure and proposed redevelopment
On 27 November 2018, the airport was closed for scheduled passenger services from 18:00 onwards, being replaced by Bohol–Panglao International Airport with advanced and modern facilities, and having the capability to operate during nighttime, enabling 24-hour operations a day. A month later, in December 2018, the site of the former airport was planned to be redeveloped into a mixed-use development, initially dubbed as the Bohol Business Park.

In October 2020, a resolution was approved by the infrastructure development committee of the Central Visayas Regional Development Council asking the Department of Public Works and Highways to authorize a study for a possible connector infrastructure or viaduct highway connecting the third Panglao-Tagbilaran bridge to Manga, a barangay in the north of the city, with an exit going to the airport. A plan was also unveiled by Governor Arthur Yap for the airport to become a creative industry hub.

In July 2021, the Tagbilaran City council raised concerns over the safety and cleanliness of the defunct airport, citing the accumulation of garbage in the runway, some vehicles that were passing directly through the runway, and other safety issues. Months prior, the airport site hosted various events including a mobile market and the month-long Ubi Festival.

A campaign rally of Vice President and presidential candidate Leni Robredo and incumbent Senator and vice-presidential candidate Francis Pangilinan was held at the airport's runway on 1 April 2022 as part of their campaign for the 2022 general elections.

Former airlines and destinations
The destinations of Tagbilaran Airport before its closure.

Gallery

See also
List of airports in the Philippines

References

External links 

Defunct airports in the Philippines
Airports disestablished in 2018
2018 disestablishments in the Philippines
Buildings and structures in Tagbilaran